Going Wild with Jeff Corwin is a nature documentary television series produced and aired in the late 1990s on the Disney Channel. Hosted by Jeff Corwin, the show lasted for three seasons from August 10, 1997, to June 13, 1999, before it was canceled.

The show was first announced in an August 1997, simultaneously with another nature-oriented Disney show, Omba Mokomba. In the show, Corwin travels to natural places around the world, including Florida, South Africa, Papua New Guinea, Death Valley, and Hawaii, searching for wild animals. In each episode, Jeff searches for a "Feature Creature", and always finds it at the end of the episode. Creatures previously featured include manatees, cobras, crocodiles, bighorn sheep, dolphins, and bears. As he explores, Jeff looks for "Creature Clues" to help him find the animal. In some episodes, Jeff also explores ancient ruins, including, Gila Cliff Dwellings, Port Arthur, Rhyolite, and Ayutthaya.

Episodes

Season 1 (1997) 
Belize (Blue Creek Rainforest Preserve) (August 10, 1997)
South Dakota (Black Hills) (August 17, 1997)
Wyoming (Yellowstone National Park) (August 24, 1997)
Montana (Glacier National Park) (August 31, 1997)
Belize II (Barrier Reef) (September 7, 1997)
Florida (Everglades National Park) (September 14, 1997)
South Africa (Ndzalama Reserve) (September 21, 1997)
Florida II (Homosassa River) (September 28, 1997)
South Africa II (Djuma Reserve) (October 5, 1997)
Idaho (Snake River Canyon) (October 12, 1997)
Arizona (Sonoran Desert) (October 19, 1997)
Kenya (Tsavo East National Park) (October 26, 1997)
New York (New York City) (November 2, 1997)
New Mexico (Gila National Forest) (November 9, 1997)
Florida III (Florida Keys) (November 16, 1997)
Colorado (Rocky Mountain National Park) (November 23, 1997)

Season 2 (1998) 
Venezuela (Llanos) (August 2, 1998)
Costa Rica (Corcovado National Park) (August 9, 1998)
California (Death Valley National Park) (August 16, 1998)
Mexico (Baja California) (August 23, 1998)
Louisiana (Atchafalaya Swamp) (September 13, 1998)
Costa Rica II (Rincon De La Vieja) (September 27, 1998)
California II (Angeles National Forest) (October 11, 1998)
Tennessee (Great Smoky Mountains National Park) (November 1, 1998)
Borneo (Bako National Park) (November 8, 1998)
Washington (Olympic National Park) (November 22, 1998)
Thailand (Khao Sok National Park) (December 13, 1998)

Season 3 (1999) 
Alaska (Katmai National Park) (January 17, 1999)
Washington II (North Cascades National Park) (January 24, 1999)
Thailand II (Khao Yai National Park) (March 7, 1999)
California III (Monterey Bay) (April 22, 1999)
Hawaiian Islands (Hawaii) (April 25, 1999)
Papua New Guinea (Morobe Province) (May 2, 1999)
Australia (Tasmania) (May 9, 1999)
Kentucky (Mammoth Cave National Park) (May 16, 1999)
Australia II (Central Australia) (May 23, 1999)
Micronesia (Palau) (May 30, 1999)
Canada (Hudson Bay, Manitoba) (June 6, 1999)
Australia III (Daintree National Park) (June 13, 1999)

Filming 
Jeff and his crew filmed in some of the most exotic places in the world. In some episodes, they filmed in special wildlife parks. This was revealed in the Special Thanks section of the credits. In some episodes, Jeff also met up with some locals, who gave him hints on where to find his "Feature Creature". Filming time depends on the location. In Death Valley, they only filmed for 2 days, but in South Africa, they filmed for 3 months.

Animals 
Jeff mainly filmed animals in the wild, but some animals were borrowed from museums and nature parks. The cougar cubs, he showed in South Dakota, were actually cubs out of wildlife rehabilitation, that were being released back into the wild. In the Special Thanks section of the credits, in some episodes it has the names of zoos and wildlife parks. The credits also state that, No Animals Were Harmed During The Making of This Program, and Some Animal Situations Have Been Recreated. It's not always easy to find the animals they need. In Los Angeles, Jeff spent 3 hours on a surf board, looking for pelicans, and in South Africa, him and his crew spend 3 weeks searching for an aardwolf, but the editing made it look like he was only there for 2 days.

Close encounters 
Jeff had some close encounters while filming his show. While filming an episode in South Africa, Jeff got attacked by a leopard, but he had a stick with him, and stood his ground, and the leopard backed off. In his journals, Jeff also stated that an African lion jumped on him, and pawed his head. In Alaska, Jeff was nearly trampled by a moose, and in Thailand, he had to keep dodging king cobra strikes.

Staff 
Hosted By Jeff Corwin
Senior Producer: Richard Schmidt
Producers: Steve Bortko, Jeff Corwin
Field Producer: Victor Abalos
Written By: Victor Abalos, Richard Schmidt, Jeff Corwin
Associate Producer: Glady Candler
Director of Photography: Frank Deloseph
Sound Recording: Todd Schoenberger
Production Manager: Stuart Dtrushkin
Post Production Supervisor: Michelle Holt
Offline Editor: Mark Walters
Online Editor: Jon Teboe
Opening Titles & Graphics By: Jon/David Productions
Additional Graphics: Tom Elleman
Title Music: Steve Altman
Assistant to the Executive Producers: Diana Meagher
Logistics Coordinators: Paul Storck, Jane Winch
Wildlife Consultant: Michael Dee
Special Thanks to: Sue's Safaris, Big Five Tours and Satans Ltd., Galdessa Lodge, Kenya Wildlife Service, Kingdom Wildlife Sanctuary, Kenya Ministry of Information & Broadcasting, BBC Worldwide Americas, Inc.
No animals were harmed in the taping of this program.
Some wildlife situations have been re-created.
Based on a concept by: Jeff Corwin and William Jackson
A Production of Popular Arts Entertainment
In Association With: Disney
MCMXCVII Popular Arts Entertainment All Rights Reserved

Titles in other languages 
Spanish: Las Aventuras de Jeff Corwin ("The Adventures of Jeff Corwin")

VHS tapes 
The show has been canceled since 1999, however, all the episodes from the series are available for purchase on VHS online.

References

External links 

 Alycia's Going Wild For Jeff Corwin page

1990s American children's television series
1990s American documentary television series
1997 American television series debuts
1999 American television series endings
American children's education television series
Disney Channel original programming 
Television series about mammals